The Haitian Basketball Federation (FHB) is the governing body of basketball in Haiti. It was founded in 1970 and members of the FIBA since its formation.

The Fédération Haïtienne de Basket-Ball operates the Haiti national team and organizes the Coupe d'Haïti (Haitian Cup) and the national championships.

Haiti Division I Men's Clubs

Regional leagues
Cap-Haïtien
Belladère
Saint-Marc
Gonaïves
Port-au-Prince
Léogâne
Les Cayes
Jacmel
Cayes
Miragoane
Hinche
Port-de-Paix
Trou-du-Nord
Petit-Goave
Delmas
Ouanaminthe

References

External links 

 Haiti at the FIBA website
 Haiti at CBC website
 

Haiti
FHB
Basketball
Basketball governing bodies in North America
Sports organizations established in 1970